Emperor Zhaowen may refer to:

Li Shou (300–343), emperor of Cheng Han
Murong Xi (385–407), emperor of Later Yan